Peter Newlands (born 31 October 1953) is a British sailor. He competed in the 470 event at the 1984 Summer Olympics.

References

External links
 

1953 births
Living people
British male sailors (sport)
Olympic sailors of Great Britain
Sailors at the 1984 Summer Olympics – 470
Sportspeople from Auckland